August Spångberg (29 March 1893 - 19 June 1987) was a Swedish labor politician. He was a member of the Riksdag (Swedish parliament), elected initially as a Communist and later as a Social Democrat.

Biography

Early life 

August Konrad Ferdinand Spångberg was born in Skärhyttan, Nora, Örebro län, Sweden. In his autobiography, I tidens ström (1966), he writes that his father, August Carlsson, left for America before he was born. Spångberg spent his early years living with his maternal grandfather, Karl Fredrik Spångberg, a coal burner, in a small cottage deep in the forests of Nora. For a short time he lived in a foster home and then moved back to live with his mother, Anna Lovisa Spångberg. August's two half-siblings—Sten Spångberg (1900-1970) and Linnéa Spångberg (1904-1981), a Swedish movie actress—were the children of his mother and Anders Gustav Olsson.

Political career 

As a young man, Spångberg found work as a railroad worker in Charlottenberg, and was active in the temperance movement and the socialist youth movement. In the 1917 split of the Social Democratic Party, Spångberg joined the Communist group headed by Zeth Höglund. In 1922, Spångberg was the youngest member ever to be elected to the Swedish parliament.

In 1929 Spångberg, together with the majority of the Swedish Communists, were expelled from the Party. He then joined Karl Kilbom in the independent communist party (later renamed as the Socialist Party).

In 1937 August Spångberg travelled with Ture Nerman to Spain to participate in the fight against the Nationalists of General Francisco Franco. They were caught in the crossfire of a battle on 3 May at the Hotel Victoria in Barcelona, which resulted in 2000 casualties. When Spångberg and Nerman return to Sweden soon after, they came home to see their party falling apart in a struggle between Karl Kilbom and Nils Flyg. Spångberg then joined the Swedish Social Democratic Party.

During World War II Spångberg participated in the Norwegian resistance movement against the Nazi occupation of Norway. He helped many people escape Nazis-occupied Norway including Willy Brandt, who would later become the Chancellor of the Federal Republic of Germany.  For his efforts Spångberg was appointed to the Order of St. Olav.

Spångberg served 46 sessions in parliament until 1964 when he retired at the age of 71.

Archive and Park

The Eda Municipality Library in Charlottenberg, Sweden holds a special collection of Augustus Spångberg's parliamentary documents, letters, and literature. There is a memorial park in Charlottenberg, next to the public library, named after August Spångberg.

Obituary
<blockquote>
MILITANT FRIEND OF PEACE

Idealist and parliament member August Spångberg, of Charlottenberg, has died at the age of 94.

He was born in Nora parish, Örebro. During the years 1922-1964, he was a member of the lower chamber of parliament, first for the Socialist party and later for the Social Democrats. During that period, he participated in 46 sessions of parliament. He was known as a fighting member and several times introduced legislation leading to a more democratic form of government. At one time, his efforts were opposed by then Prime Minister Tage Erlander as being impractical.

For his role in Norway's resistance effort during World War II, he was awarded the Norwegian Order of St. Olav. In 1967, he was presented with the Eldhs peace award for his "unfaltering efforts in the cause of peace and disarmament."  He labored many years in the Swedish peace and neutrality societies.At the age of 82, he authored a novel, Radmannen, the Tale of a Crime [Rådmannen: En historia om ett brott] which dealt with the Unman affair, of the 1950s, in which he had been involved and against which he fought.

The nearest survivors include his wife, Sofie, nee Nilsson, a son Arne, his wife Anne-Marie, and several grandchildren and great-grandchildren.
</blockquote>

 Notes 
Obituary in Stockholm newspaper Dagens Nyheter (Daily News), 24 June 1987 (translated by Arthur Holmberg)
For more information about his early life and career, see his autobiography, I tidens ström Works 
1931: Bröd eller svältdöd? 1932: Program och gärningar. Socialdemokratisk riksdagspolitik valperioden 1929-1932  
1937: Spanien i revolution1966: I tidens ström (In time's stream)
1975: Rådmannen: En historia om ett brott (The Councilman, the Tale of a Crime'')
More books: LIBRIS

References

External links
August Spångbergs Park
Audio clip: Partierna otydliga i monarkifrågan 
Audio clip: Riksdagsdebatt om femtiotalets rättsröteaffärer 
Article: The battle for peace 

My Road to Berlin 
Texter av August Spångberg 
Dictionary of Swedish National Biography 

1893 births
1987 deaths
People from Nora Municipality
Swedish communists
Members of the Riksdag from the Social Democrats
Swedish people of the Spanish Civil War